The Mocubúri River (known variously as Rio Mukumburi, Rio Mocubúri, Rio Mecuburi, Rio Mecuburi, Rio Mocuburi, Rio Mocubúri, or Rio Mukumburi)
is a river of Mozambique. It flows to the south of the Ruvuma River, and is characterised by seasonal flows and lined by swamps.

References

Rivers of Mozambique